Saint Paul's School is a private all-boys Lasallian high school, located in Covington, Louisiana just to the north of New Orleans, United States. Located in the Roman Catholic Archdiocese of New Orleans, the school is run by the Christian Brothers and is one of the 1,000 Lasallian schools in more than 80 countries. It is part of 300 years of history originating from the founding of the Christian Brother Schools by Saint Jean Baptiste de La Salle. In 2015 and 2021, the United States Department of Education recognized St. Paul's as a Blue Ribbon School.

History 
In 1904, a group of residents of the Covington area banded together to fund the building of a new public school. After acquiring a tract of land and building a one-story, 2 bedroom building, the school, called Dixon Academy, opened in 1907. The school failed to attract enough students to remain viable.

In 1911, the school property was sold to the Benedictines of nearby Saint Joseph Abbey. The school was renamed Saint Paul's, and reopened in September, 1911, with only 48 students. By the end of the first session, enrollment numbered 70 boarders and 30 day students.

Meanwhile, nineteen French Christian Brothers had emigrated to Louisiana from France and Mexico, having been exiled for political reasons and purchased the school from the Benedictines.

Although Saint Paul's originally taught students only at high school level, it grew to encompass middle and elementary levels; this continued into the 1950s. However, by the 1960s there were enough other schools in the area to allow Saint Paul's to begin to eliminate the younger grades, with the intention of focusing on a college preparatory curriculum. By the late 1970s, the school had a six-year program, 7th-12th grades. The 1981-82 year was the final session with a 7th grade class, and the school continues a five-year program to this day.

The original Dixon Academy building (known as Dixon Hall on campus) had long been supplanted by other buildings, but remained standing and used for storage. In November 1981, during Thanksgiving break, the building burned to the ground; a forensic investigation determined old electrical wiring to be the cause. Using bricks from the original structure, a patio/garden area was created on the site, and dubbed "Founders' Circle".

The last of the original 19 brothers, Bro. Charles Crouzet, remained living on campus, although retired from teaching, until his death in 1985. A statue of Jesus was erected in Founders' Circle and dedicated to Bro. Charles in honor of his faithful devotion to the school and God.

As a boarding school, Saint Paul's was able to accommodate students from a wide geographic area; over the years, students from Central and South America, France, Greece, Russia, Korea, and Japan attended. However, due to a general decline in boarders, the increasing expense of housing residents, and the prospect of overhauling a dormitory which was in disrepair, Saint Paul's converted to an all day-student program beginning with the 2003-2004 school year.

In 2011, Saint Paul's celebrated its centennial birthday.

The Lasalle Hall dormitory was originally built as a two-wing building in 1964, with a third central wing added in 1970. In 2010-2011, the center wing (which had deteriorated beyond repair) was removed, and the remaining space underwent a full renovation and conversion into classroom space as the new Math and Science building. In the central courtyard, a set of pillars was added with plaques for each of the Lasallian Core Principles. The first day of classes in the renovated space was January 9, 2012.

During the 2014-2015 school year, Saint Paul's started construction on a new gym for the Gene Bennet Sports Complex. The new gym was completed and dedicated in September 2015. The new gym is the primary home for basketball and physical education programs, while wrestling and powerlifting is housed in a renovated Gene Bennett Sports Complex.

During summer 2018 to fall 2018, Benilde Hall was renovated. Saint Paul's removed the second floor library and the ground floor was made into a student commons area.

Activities and Clubs
 Bowling Club
 Computer Club
 Drama (Marian Players) 
 Dumbledore's Army
 Environmental Science Club
 Guerrilla Wolves Video Club
 Habitat Club
 HOSA
 Key Club
 Lasallian Youth Leaders
 Level Retreat
 Marching Band (Marching Wolves)
 Mu Alpha Theta
 National Junior Honor Society
 National Honor Society
 Quiz Bowl
 School Newspaper (The Paper Wolf)
 Spanish Club
 Sea Perch
 Shell Eco Car
 The Society of St. Gregory the Great
 Student Council
 Student Hosts
 Ultimate Frisbee Club
 Yearbook (The Conifer)
 Young Lawyers Club

Athletics 
St. Paul's School athletics competes in the LHSAA.

The school offers the following sports programs:
 Baseball  
 Basketball 
 Bowling
 Cross Country  
 Football 
 Golf 
 In-Line Hockey 
 Lacrosse
 Powerlifting 
 Soccer 
 Swimming
 Tennis 
 Track and Field 
 Ultimate Frisbee 
 Wrestling

Championships
Baseball Championships
(1) State: 2019

Cross Country Championships
(6) State: 1998, 1999, 2000, 2001, 2013, 2016

The team won six state championships, four consecutively in '98, '99, '00, '01, and two more in '13 and '16. In 2011 the team placed 3rd in the LHSAA state championships and in 2012 were the state runners-up.

In 2017, Eric Coston set the Louisiana high school 3-mile record time at 14:25.7

Football Championships
(11) District: 1990, 2005, 2006, 2007, 2009, 2010, 2011, 2012, 2013, 2015, 2016

Lacrosse Championships
(1) State: 2017

Powerlifting Championships
(1) State: 2012 

Soccer Championships
(5) State: 2011, 2013, 2014, 2015, 2016 

The soccer team beat Jesuit-New Orleans in the 2011 State Championship. The team ended as runner up to Jesuit in the 2012 state championship. The team won a state championship again in 2013 and in 2014, the team beat Grace King 3-0 to win another state championship. During the 2015 season, the soccer team was rated #1 in Louisiana and #1 in the country. They again won the state championship in 2015 to make it a 3-peat. Then, in 2016, the soccer team defeated Catholic High in Baton Rouge, LA to make it a 4-peat.

Tennis Championships
(1) State: 1991 (First state championship in school history)

Track and Field Championships
(1) District: 2012

Buildings 
 Administration Building
 Advancement Office
 Alumni Memorial Theater
 Art Building
 Band Building
 Benilde Hall: a three-story building.  
 Briggs Assembly Center: used for campus ministry, graduation performances, fund raisers, school functions.
 Brother's Residence
 Cafeteria
 Chapel
 The Gene Bennett Sports Complex: basketball court, wrestling room, weight room, locker room, trainer's office, football coach's office
 Horack Pavilion
 Hunter Stadium
 La Salle Hall: originally used as a dormitory building, but after major renovations in 2011, the building now features over 30,000 square feet of academic space. 
 Main School Building: a two-story building housing the Records/Attendance Offices. 
 Maintenance Building
 New Gym - finished in fall 2015-2016 school year.
 Wolf Dome

Notable alumni 
Houston Bates, American football player
Andy Cannizaro, baseball player
Khaled Mattawa, poet, translator,  Chancellor of the Academy of American Poets, teacher at the University of Michigan, Ann Arbor.
Tanner Rainey, baseball player
Ryan Schimpf, baseball player
Ian Somerhalder, actor and model

References

External links 
 

Catholic secondary schools in Louisiana
Catholic secondary schools in New Orleans
Boys' schools in Louisiana
Educational institutions established in 1911
1911 establishments in Louisiana
Schools in St. Tammany Parish, Louisiana
Lasallian schools in the United States